Kharga Malla was the twelfth king of the Mallabhum. He ruled from 841 to 862 AD.

History
Kharga Malla's name was lent to the city of Kharagpur after his army conquered it.

References

Sources
 

Malla rulers
Kings of Mallabhum
9th-century Indian monarchs
Mallabhum